Elekosmioi was a town located near the coast of the Propontis in ancient Bithynia, between Cius and Apamea Myrlea.

Its site is located near Elegmi, Asiatic Turkey.

References

Populated places in Bithynia
Former populated places in Turkey